Rupela liberta is a moth in the family Crambidae. It was described by Carl Heinrich in 1937. It is found in Mexico (Durango, Colima, Jalapa) and Panama.

The wingspan is 20–25 mm. The wings are white.

References

Moths described in 1937
Schoenobiinae
Taxa named by Carl Heinrich